Magu is a legendary Taoist xian associated with the elixir of life, and a symbolic protector of women in Chinese mythology. Stories in Chinese literature describe Magu as a beautiful young woman with long birdlike fingernails, while early myths associate her with caves. Magu xian shou is a popular motif in Chinese art.

In Korean tradition and sources, Mago (麻姑 pronounced in Korean) is known as the Great Mother and the Creatrix. Mago manifests broadly and densely primarily but not limitedly in Korean sources, which includes the Budoji, folklore, place-names, art, classical literature, folksongs, shamanic songs (muga), historical and religious texts, and miscellaneous data.  Based on the primary sources concerning Mago, Helen Hye-Sook Hwang reconstructed Magoism, the Way of the Creatrix.

Name
Magu's name compounds two common Chinese words: ma "cannabis; hemp" and gu "aunt; maid". Translating Magu into English is problematic, depending upon whether her name is interpreted as a "maid", "priestess", or "goddess" of "hemp", "marijuana", or something else.  According to Hwang, the meaning of Mago or Magu is complex to assess and writes:

Discussion of Mago epithets, Magoist onomastics, is not simple in any manner for they are not only fluid and polysemic but also etiological, explaining the origin of major East Asian deities, concepts, and cultural and faith practices. It is a daunting task in that unravelling HER names necessarily requires a restoration of the forgotten Magoist contexts across cultures and periods. Foremost, it is difficult because they convey a gynocentric consciousness that is dissimilar to the patriarchal convention of names, which is monolithic and discrete. Our discussion is necessarily morphological, exposing the main structure of Mago epithets. “Mago” is an old word, if not the first, for the Creatrix combined with ma, the sound for mother, and go, the word for the great mother. Both stems, ma and go, indicating the human mother and the Creatrix, attest to the gynocentric consciousness in which mothers are viewed as the representative of the Creatrix. “Ma” is a universal root for “mother.” While “Go” alone stands for “Mago” or “Magoist,” it is related with the two words, Halmi and Gom or Goma. First, its logographic character, “Go 姑,” combination of nyeo (女 woman) and go (古 Old or Ancient), comes from “halmi 할미,” which means the great mother, grandmother, and/or crone. Secondly, it is a short form of “Gom” or “Goma,” the shaman queen of the royal bear clan who founded the Danguk confederacy of nine states (3898-2333 BCE). In discussing Mago epithets, Goma is an enormously important Magoist shaman ruler of Old Magoist East Asia/Korea, deified as the supreme Goddess from earth. In fact, it is impossible to discuss Mago without relation to Goma, the originator of the mythic system of Magoism. The very perception of Magoism (teaching of the Creatrix) is attributed to Goma. Nonetheless, we are uncertain if “Mago” is derived from “Goma” or vice versa. Goma taught people Mago, the Creatrix, within the theological scheme of Nine Numerology. Through the Divine Tree, the world tree, Goma envisioned the Magoist Cosmogony of the Nine Mago Creatrix. She instatiated Danguk’s socio- political-cultural systems in accordance of Nine Numerology. That said, it is corollary that Mago and Goma, two distinctive divine personalities, often manifest as a merged Magoma persona in folktales.

The logographic meaning of Mago (麻姑) as Hemp Goddess remains to be explored. A small number of folkloric narratives from Korea associate Mago with hemp. In one story, Mago is portrayed as the cosmic weaver who descends in the region (Jinhae, South Gyeongsang) to herald the season of weaving hemp. In other stories, she is said to be the giant cosmogonist, weaving with islands and rocks taking as the spindle and the loom shuttle. Undoubtedly, Magoists regarded hemp as a sacred plant and used it for various purposes (food, clothes, medicines, and rituals). It was also used as means of currency from the time of Joseon (2333-232 BCE). Linguistics show that hemp is a favored material in traditional Korea. In Korean language, linguistic interplay exists between hemp and Mago. Hemp in Korean is called ma (마) or sam (삼), both of which are the homonym of Mago and Samsin (Triad Divine) respectively. While known for variant textiles, daema (대마), ama (아마), jeoma (저마), hwangma (황마), and sambe (삼베), “ma (hemp)” is found in such saying as, “hair wave like a bundle of hemp.”

Magu is called Mago in Korean and Mako in Japanese. Mago is the Great Mother and the Creatrix in Korean creation myths. Helen Hye-Sook Hwang (also noted asl Hye-Sook Hwang) calls her "the Great Goddess" and proposes "Magoism, the archaic gynocentric cultural matrix of East Asia, which derives from the worship of Mago as creatress, progenitress, and sovereign." According to the pseudo historical work Budoji, Korean mytho-history began with the "Era of Mago." In Japan, Mako is usually referenced in connection to the Chinese story (below) about Magu's long fingernails, for instance, the phrase Mako sōyō ( "Magu scratches the itch") metaphorically means "things going like one imagined".

Cultic origins

While Magu folktales are familiar in East Asia, the sociologist Wolfram Eberhard was the first Western scholar to analyze them. He categorized Magu under a cultural chain of Yao love songs and festivals. Based on references in Chinese texts, Eberhard proposed two centers for the Magu cult, in the present-day provinces of Jiangxi and Hubei. Evidence for an "original cultic center" near Nancheng county in southwestern Jiangxi includes several place names, and, among them, two mountains'. The famous Magu Shan ( "Magu Mountain") is located in Nancheng, and Taoists regard its Danxia Dong ( "Cinnabar Cloud Grotto"), as the 28th of 36 sacred dongtian  "Grotto-heavens, heaven-reaching grottos"). The famous Tang Dynasty Daoist calligrapher Yan Zhenqing visited Mt Magu and inscribed the Magu Shan Xiantan Ji ( "Record of the Mountain Platform where Magu Ascended to Immortality"). A second Magu Mountain is located in Jianchang county (near Nanfeng ). Magu Wine is made in Jianchang and nearby Linchuan. In addition, Magu is an alternate name for Huagu ( "flower maid") Mountain in Xuancheng county of Anhui. Evidence for a secondary area for the Magu cult in Hubei includes the Song dynasty temple near Hankou, along with the Magu Temple on Mount Heng. Several early folktales from Sichuan province associate Magu with caves and one describes a shaman who invoked her. Regarding the traditions that she was born in Jiangxi and became an immortal xian in Shandong, Eberhard says, "This ascent to heaven, typical of Taoists, connects her with the immortal saints, and indeed she is regarded as a symbol of long life and rebirth, and therefore in the Chinese drama, appears a good omen during birthday celebrations."

Early descriptions

Campany provides details of Magu mythology in his annotated translation of Ge Hong's Shenxian zhuan ( "Biographies of Divine immortals", ca. 317 CE). He compares four Chinese textual variations of Magu stories.

The Shenxian Zhuan Daoist hagiography of Wang Yuan (or Wang Fangping ) and Magu has the longest early descriptions of her. Wang was supposedly a Confucianist scholar who quit his official post during the reign (146-168 CE) of Emperor Huan of Han and went into the mountains to become a Daoist xian. Later, while traveling in Wu (modern Zhejiang), Wang met Cai Jing , whose physiognomy indicated he was destined to become an immortal, and taught him the basic techniques. After Cai had been gone for "over a decade", he suddenly returned home, looking like a young man, announced that Lord Wang would visit on the "seventh day of the seventh month" (later associated with the Cowherd and Weaver Girl lovers' festival), and ordered preparations for a feast. After Wang and his celestial entourage arrived on the auspicious "double-seven" day, he invited Magu to join their celebration because "It has been a long time since you were in the human realm." She replied by invisible messenger. "Maid Ma bows and says: 'Without our realizing it, more than five hundred years have passed since our last meeting!'" After apologizing that she would be delayed owing to an appointment at Penglai Mountain (a legendary island in the Eastern Sea, where the elixir of immortality grows), Ma arrived four hours later.
She appeared to be a handsome woman of eighteen or nineteen; her hair was done up, and several loose strands hung down to her waist. Her gown had a pattern of colors, but it was not woven; it shimmered, dazzling the eyes, and was indescribable – it was not of this world. She approached and bowed to Wang, who bade her rise. When they were both seated, they called for the travelling canteen. The servings were piled up on gold platters and in jade cups without limit. There were rare delicacies, many of them made from flowers and fruits, and their fragrance permeated the air inside [Cai's home] and out. When the meat was sliced and served, [in flavor] it resembled broiled mo, and was announced as kirin meat. 
Maid Ma declared: "Since I entered your service, I have seen the Eastern Sea turn to mulberry fields three times. As one proceeded across to Penglai, the water came only up to one's waist. I wonder whether it will turn to dry land once again." Wang answered with a sigh, "Oh, the sages all say that the Eastern Sea will once again become blowing dust."
This "traveling canteen" is the xingchu, an exotic banquet that xian transcendents have the ability to summon at will.

Magu legends frequently mention these mulberry fields in the East Sea. When Magu was introduced to the women in Cai's family, she transformed some rice into pearls as a trick to avoid the unclean influences of a recent childbirth. Then Wang presented Cai's family with a strong liquor from "the celestial kitchens", and warned that it was "unfit for drinking by ordinary people". Even after diluting the liquor with water, everyone became intoxicated and wanted more.
Maid Ma's fingernails resembled bird claws. When Cai Jing noticed them, he thought to himself, "My back itches. Wouldn't it be great if I could get her to scratch my back with those nails?" Now, Wang Yuan knew what Cai was saying in his heart, so he ordered him bound and whipped, chiding, "Maid Ma is a divine personage. How dare you think that her nails could scratch your back!" The whip lashing Cai's back was the only thing visible; no one was seen wielding it. Wang added, "My whippings are not given without cause." 

Some later versions of this legend say Ma was Wang's sister. The poet Li Bai immortalized two Classical Chinese expressions from this story. Magu saobei ( "Magu scratches [my] back") refers to her extraordinary fingernails. Canghai sangtian ( "blue ocean [turns to] mulberry fields") means "great changes over the course of time"; Needham says early Daoists observed seashells in mountainous rocks and recognized the vast scale of geologic transformations.

The Lieyi zhuan ( "Arrayed Marvels", late 2nd or early 3rd century), attributed to Cao Pi (187-226 CE) has three stories about Wang Fangping. 
The third gives a version of the incident of Cai Jing's inappropriate fantasy concerning Maid Ma and her luxuriant four-inch nails. Here, Cai Jing's home is located in Dongyang; he is not whipped but rather flung to the ground, his eyes running blood; and Maid Ma herself, identified as "a divine transcendent" (shenxian), is the one who reads his thoughts and does the punishing.

Kohn includes a woodblock from the illustrated Zengxiang Liexian zhuan.

The Yiyuan ( "Garden of Marvels", early 5th century), by Liu Jingshu, records a story about Meigu ( "Plum Maid") or Magu, and suggests her cult originated during the Qin Dynasty (221-206 BCE).
During Qin times, there was a Temple to Maid Mei  – or, as one version has it, Maid Ma – beside a lake. When alive, she had possessed arts of the Dao. She could walk on water in her shoes. Later she violated the laws of the Dao, and her husband, out of anger, murdered her and dumped her body in the lake. Following the current, it floated on the waves until it reached the [present site of] the temple. A subordinate shaman directed that she be encoffined but not immediately buried. Very soon a square, lacquered coffin appeared in the shrine hall. [From then on], at the end and beginning of each lunar month, people there could make out through the fog an indistinct figure, wearing shoes. Fishing and hunting were prohibited in the area of the temple, and violators would always become lost or drown. Shamans said that it was because the Maid had suffered a painful death and hates to see other beings cruelly killed.

Campany reads this legend to describe founding a temple, probably on Lake Gongting, and translates these "shaman" and "shrine" references in the future tense. Compare the present tense translation of Miyakawa who interprets her body floating to an existing temple.

The Qi Xie ji (6th century) associates Magu with snakes. It describes her as a commoner from Fuyang, Zhejiang, rather than a Daoist transcendent, who loved raw meat hash. She captured a strange beast resembling a sea turtle and a serpent, and ate it with her companion Hua Ben ( "Flower Root"). When Ma started choking, Hua could see a snake flicking its tongue inside her mouth. She later enjoyed a meal at Hua's house, but upon learning that they had eaten snake meat, she vomited blood and died. Campany concludes:
This story hints at an even older stratum of legend behind the Maid Ma cult: like other territorial gods known to Chinese religious history, she may have begun as a theriomorphic deity (perhaps snake-headed) who gradually metamorphosed into a human being and finally – the process culminating in Ge Hong's Traditions narrative – into a full-fledged transcendent. Seen in this light, several details of the Traditions hagiography might be read as betraying these chthonic origins. Among these are Maid Ma's long nails, the featuring of meat dishes among the fantastic foods served by the travelling canteen, and the scene describing the "summoning" of Maid Ma, which is reminiscent of shamanic invocations of deities to attend spirit-writing sessions.

Hemp goddess

Hellmut Wilhelm's book review  of Eberhard's original German book suggested that Magu was associated with cannabis. Eberhard dismissed this hypothesis in the English version.
I have no indication that the goddess ever was a goddess of the hemp plant (ma) as H. Wilhelm surmised (Monumenta Serica vol. 9, p. 213 note 9). She often wears aboriginal attire, a dress with a collar made of leaves, but not of hemp, which only sometimes has developed, according to a late fashion into a cape of cloth.

Campany mentions the Chinese use of ma "hemp" fibers as a weaving material. "(Note also her shimmering, multicolored gown, "not of this world"; but we are told that it was not woven, at least not in an ordinary way.) I know of no attempt to explain the name Ma gu (literally, "the Hemp Maiden")." 

The historian and sinologist Joseph Needham connected myths about Magu "the Hemp Damsel" with early Daoist religious usages of cannabis. Cannabis sativa is described by the oldest Chinese pharmacopeia, the (ca. 100 CE) Shennong Bencaojing  ("Shennong's Materia Medica Classic"). "The flowers when they burst (when the pollen is scattered) are called  [mafen] or  [mabo]. The best time for gathering is the 7th day of the 7th month. The seeds are gathered in the 9th month. The seeds which have entered the soil are injurious to man. It grows on Mount Tai."
Needham pointed out that Magu was goddess of Shandong's sacred Mount Tai, where cannabis "was supposed to be gathered on the seventh day of the seventh month, a day of seance banquets in the Taoist communities". The (ca. 570 CE) Daoist encyclopedia Wushang Biyao  records that cannabis was added into ritual censers.

The Shangqing School of Taoism provides a good example. Yang Xi (330-c. 386 CE) was "aided almost certainly by cannabis" in writing the Shangqing scriptures during nightly visitations by Taoist "immortals". Tao Hongjing (456-536 CE), who edited the official Shangqing canon, also recorded, "Hemp-seeds ([mabo] ) are very little used in medicine, but the magician-technicians ([shujia] ) say that if one consumes them with ginseng it will give one preternatural knowledge of events in the future."

Needham concluded,
Thus all in all there is much reason for thinking that the ancient Taoists experimented systematically with hallucinogenic smokes, using techniques which arose directly out of liturgical observance. … At all events the incense-burner remained the centre of changes and transformations associated with worship, sacrifice, ascending perfume of sweet savour, fire, combustion, disintegration, transformation, vision, communication with spiritual beings, and assurances of immortality. Wai tan and nei tan met around the incense-burner. Might one not indeed think of it as their point of origin?

See also
Budoji
 He Xiangu
 Mulberry fields (idiom)
 Queen Mother of the West
 Shen (Chinese religion)
 Wei Huacun
 Xian (Taoism)

Bibliography
 
  
 
  
 

Footnotes

Further reading

External links
 Ma Gu Temple, Kunyu Mountain Shaolin Martial Arts Academy
 Way of Infinite Harmony website
 Ma Gu Presenting the Peaches, painting by Deng Fen 鄧芬, Hong Kong Museum of Art
 麻姑山, Daoist sites on Ma Gu Mountain, Jiangxi Bureau of Ethnic Minorities (in Chinese)

Cannabis in China
Chinese goddesses
Cannabis and religion
Taoist immortals